Norrköping Municipality (Norrköpings kommun) is a municipality in Östergötland County in southeast Sweden. Its seat is located in the city of Norrköping, with some 90,000 inhabitants. It is the largest municipality in Östergötland.

By the time of the local government reform of 1971 the City of Norrköping was amalgamated with the rural municipality of Skärblacka forming a new municipality of unitary type. In 1974 Vikbolandet was added. The number of original local government units (as of 1863) which are in the present municipality is 26.

Localities
Places with more than 200 inhabitants as of 2000:
Herstadberg
Jursla
Kimstad
Krokek
Lindö
Ljunga
Loddby
Norrköping (seat)
Norsholm
Simonstorp
Skärblacka
Strömsfors
Svärtinge
Vånga
Åby
Åselstad
Öbonäs
Östra Husby

Government and infrastructure
The Swedish Transport Agency has its headquarters in Norrköping, Norrköping Municipality. When the Civil Aviation Administration existed, its head office was in Norrköping.

International relations

Twin towns — Sister cities
Norrköping is twinned with:

See also

Köping (concept)
Nävsjön
Å, Sweden

References

External links

Norrköping Municipality - Official site 
Norrköping Tourism 

 
Norrköping
Municipalities of Östergötland County